Sirvan Khosravi (born 26 July 1982) is an Iranian singer, songwriter, and music producer. He has produced music for various artists including Xaniar Khosravi, his younger brother, who is also a singer-song writer. He rose to fame in 2005 after releasing his debut album "To Khial Kardi Beri".

Early life 
Sirvan Khosravi was born in Tehran. He is of Persian descent. He started learning the keyboard at age 11. At 16 he took some lessons with Kaveh Yaghmaei who became his mentor.he is also what you can call sandiskhor duo to him putting up a concert after the protest of 2022.

Career
Before releasing his first album in 2005, Sirvan participated in the works of other Iranian artists as an Audio Engineer, Mixing and Mastering Engineer and Producer. After meeting Omid Athari Nejad in 2001, he produced his first album titled "To Khial Kardi Beri" and released it in 2005.

Khosravi started to produce his second music album "Sa’ate 9" from 2005 and released it in 2009. He performed his first concert in February 2009. In 2012, he became very popular among Iranians by performing the end song of "Sakhteman Pezeshkan" or "Doctors' Building" show.

After gaining success with his album Sa'ate 9 with hits such as "Emrooz Mikham Behet Begam" (today, I want to tell you), "Zendegi Hamin Emrooze" (Life is just today), "Delam Gerefte" (I'm Feeling Blue), he started to work on his next album Jaddeie Royaha (Road of Dreams) which was again a success. But after releasing some "highly energetic" singles he rose to national fame and started his Iran tour and managed to gain the media and the audience's attention. He continued playing at concerts in major cities of Iran and before his unplugged album, he released some high quality music videos that his fans responded well to. He also recorded a high energy World Cup single with his brother, Xaniar Khosravi, titled "70 Million Stars". He received some praise for his unplugged album in 2016 which was filmed in Azadi Tower in 2015 and included his live performances and some behind the scenes from his music videos. This album was sponsored by AXE and was directed by the Farahbod brothers, the cover was designed by Ali Ghazizadeh, and the songs were rearranged by Sirvan's friend Kaveh Yaghmaei and Sirvan himself.. His Song Tanha Nazar reached number 5 on Spotify's Hong Kong Top 50 chart on 24 May 2020.

Discography

Albums
2005: To Khial Kardi Beri
2009: 9 O’clock
2012: Road of Dreams
2016: Unplugged
2017: Borderless
2020: Monologue
2020: Monologue: At The Top Of Tehran

Singles
2006: "Stay With Me"
2006: "Way of the World" (Remix)
2007: "The Tradition of the World" (New Version) 
2010: "Yes (Are)" (Night Mix)
2011: "Autumn Rain" (Baroon Paeezi)
2011: "I Fell in Love With You"
2011: "Building of the Doctors"
2011: "No, Don't Go" (Na Naro)
2011: "Saying Goodbye" (Khodafezi)
2012: "I Love You" (With Omid Hajili)
2012: "Spring is Close" (Bahar Nazdike) 
2012: "You Thought of Leaving" (To Khial Kardi Beri) (New Version)
2013: "Restless" (BiGharar) (Club Mix)
2013: "I Love Life" (Dost Daram Zendegi ro)
2013: "This Soon" (Be Hamin Zoodi)
2013: "Shine Again" (Bazam Betab)
2014: "70 Million Stars" (70 Million Setare)
2014: "Memories Of You" (Khaterate Too)
2014: "Where are You" (Kojaie Too)
2015: "One Day You Will Come (Ye Roozi Miay)"
2016: "Soojehat Tekrarieh"
2016: "Empty Frame (Ghabe Akse Khali)"
2017: "Do not be surprised(Tajob Nakon)"
2017: "Come Back (Bargard)"
2017: "Many days passed (kheyli rooza gozasht)"
2017:"I'm happy (khoshalam)"
2017:"l'm not backing down (nemiram aghab)"
2017:"This is not a place to stay (Inja jay moondan nist)"
2019:"jaye man nisti"
2019:"dorost nemisham"
2019:"dorost nemisham (xaniar remix)"
2019:"Tanha Nazar(Live)"
2020:"In Hess Naabe"
2020:"Tanha Nazar(Remix)"
2020:"Baroone Payizi(Live)"
2020:"Hobab (Bubble)"
2022: "Divoonegi"-Sirvan Khosravi

Songwriting and producing (for other artists)

Albums
2004: Harmoonie Solh (Peace Harmony) – Farid Merci
2006: Varan – Varan Group
2006: Kenare Mahe Doodi (Beside the Smoky Moon) – Alireza Tehrani
2009: Bi To Tanham (I am Alone Without You) – Amir Yegane
2010: Eshghe Man Bash (Be My Love) – Behnam Safavi
2010: Romantic – Shahab Ramazan
2011: Asir (Slave) – Alireza Ghomeishi
2011: Mano Raha Kon (Leave Me) – Mehdi Yarahi
2012: Aramesh (Peace) –Behnam Safavi
2012: Asheghaneha (The Amorous) – Ehsan Khajeh Amiri
2012: To Mahkumi be Bargashtan (You are Convicted to Return) – Khashayar Etemadi
2013: "Jashne Tanhaee" (Celebrating Loneliness) – Shahab Ramezan

Singles
2006: "Ki Delesh Miad ke Tanhat Bezare?" ("How can Anybody Leave you Alone?") – Arsham
2006: "Havvaye Bi Havas" (Havva Without Passion) – Arsham
2006: "Mishe Asheghe To Bud" (It's Possible to Love You) – Arsham
2006: "Nakone Shab Berese" (Night Would Come) – Arsham
2006: "Asemune Eshgham" (Sky of My Love) – Afshin Sepehr
2006: "Javooni" (Youth) – Afshin Sepehr
2006: "Doosam Nadari" (You Don't Love Me) – Tufan Karami
2007: "To Gozashti az Eshgh" (You Crossed the Love) – Mehdi Asadi
2007: "Vaysa Donya" (World, Wait) – Reza Sadeghi
2007: "Vali Ye Roozi Dastat …" (But Someday your Hands...) – Ardalan
2007: "Geryehasho be Man Bede" (Give Me the Cries) – Ario Habibi
2008: "Mikham Begam" (I Want to Say) – Hafez Hamed
2008: "Khatereha" (Memories) – Moein,
2008: "Mesle Ye Khatere" (Like a Memory) – Nader Meschi
2008: "Mantaghe-e Mamnoo'e" (Forbidden Zone) – Nader Meschi
2008: "Yalla" (Hurry up) – Mehdi Asadi
2008: "Eshghe Mani" (You are My Love) – Omid Hajili
2008: "Baraye Asheghi Dire" (It's Late for Love) – Omid Hajili
2009: "Tafre Naro" (Don't Evade) – Xaniar Khosravi
2009: "Risk" – Xaniar Khosravi
2009: "Dooset Dashtam" (I Loved You) – Emad, Ramin
2009: "Forsate Ezterari" (Critical Opportunity) – Emad, Ramin
2009: "Bayla" – Ramin Khazayi
2009: "Karet Doroste" (Nice Job) – Ramin Khazayi
2010: "Hypnotism" – Xaniar Khosravi
2011: "Nemidunam" (I Don't Know) – Ehsan Khajeh Amiri
2011: "Jonun" (Craziness) – Shahab Ramezan
2011: "Jadde-e Donya" (The Road of the World) – Shahab Ramezan
2011: "Jashne Tanhayi" (Loneliness Celebration) – Shahab Ramezan
2011: "Kenare Mahtab" (Next to Moonlight) – Xaniar Khosravi, Milad Derakhshani
2011: "Hamsangar" (Comrade) – Shahab Ramezan
2012: "Deltangetam" (I Miss You) – Behnam Safavi
2012: "Kash Khoda Mano Bebine" (I Wish God See Me) – Behnam Safavi
2012: "Che Bi Andaze Mikhamet" (How much I want You) – Behnam Safavi
2012: "Khoshbakhtam" (I Am Fortunate) – Shahab Ramezan
2012: "Ehsase Aramesh" (Peaceful Feeling) – Ehsan Khajeh Amiri
2012: "Taghdir" (Destiny) – Khashayar Etemadi
2013: "Bedune To" (Without You) – Xaniar Khosravi
2013: "Dasti Dasti" XaniaR Khosravi
2021: "Gharib E Ashena"- Ehaam

Filmography

See also 

 Xaniar Khosravi
 Persian pop music

References

External links 

 

1982 births
Living people
Iranian pianists
Iranian musicians
Iranian composers
Iranian guitarists
People from Tehran
Iranian pop singers
Singers from Tehran
Kurdish male singers
Iranian rock singers
Iranian male singers
21st-century pianists
Iranian Kurdish people
21st-century guitarists
Iranian music arrangers
Persian-language singers
21st-century male singers
Iranian singer-songwriters
21st-century male musicians
Iranian people of Kurdish descent
21st-century Iranian male singers